The 1979–80 Arizona State Sun Devils men's basketball team represented the Arizona State University during the 1979–80 NCAA Division I men's basketball season. This was Ned Wulk's 23rd season as head coach. The Sun Devils defeated Loyola Marymount in the first round to advance to the Second Round.

Roster

Schedule

|-
!colspan=12 style=|NCAA Tournament

Awards and honors
Byron Scott  Pac-10 Freshman of the Year

References 

Arizona State
Arizona State Sun Devils
Arizona State Sun Devils men's basketball seasons
Arizona State Sun Devils
Arizona State